Yokosuka Stadium is a baseball stadium in Japan, and the home ground of the Yokohama DeNA Baystars Eastern League affiliate.  It was opened in 1949 as Oppama Park, and rebuilt in 1997.

Prior tenants of the stadium are Yokohama BayStars, Shonan Searex, and Yokohama BayStars.

References

Baseball venues in Japan